Sergey Vladimirovich Taboritsky (12 August 1897 – 16 October 1980) was a Russian ultranationalist and monarchist. From 1936 to 1945, he was the deputy of the Bureau for the Russian Refugees in Germany. After 1942, Taboritsky became a member of the Nazi Party, and directly collaborated with the Gestapo.

Biography

Early years 
Sergey and his younger brother, Nikolay Taborisky (the spelling of his name at the beginning of the twentieth century was inconsistent; during the emigration years, the "Taboritsky" variant was used) were the illegitimate children of baptized Jewish tailor and owner of a fashion shop Anna Vladimirovna and her cohabitant, Sergey Alexandrovich Zapevalov (who broke up with her in 1901). Both brothers were raised as Orthodox Christians. Taboritsky's godfather was the future Ober-Procurator Vladimir Sabler. The brothers had the surname of Anna Vladimirovna's first husband, also Jewish, Wulf Aizikovich Taborissky, a tradesman from Ashmyany, who had left the country long before both of them were born, in 1887. According to the documents, they were regarded as the children of Wulf Taborissky, since the first divorce of their mother occurred only in 1899. The mother became a second guild merchant and married a noble named Marasanov, taking his surname. Anna Marasanova died in March 1914 in France. In 1915, after their mother's death, Sergey and Nikolay unsuccessfully tried to reach the Petrograd Spiritual Consistory with a plea to recognize them as the children of the "Russian Orthodox face" and rid them of the "Cain's seal", citing their religious and monarchist sentiments.

He graduated from the Realschule of Gurevich in 1915. There were later stories that Taboritsky was participating in World War I fighting under the command of Grand Duke Michael Alexandrovich as part of the Caucasian Native Cavalry Division, but can't be considered as reliable, as documented information on his activities in 1915-1919 has not been found. According to some reports, he was an assistant to the commissioner from the State Duma and deputy Georgy Deryugin during this time.

After the February Revolution, he was in Ukraine, where he left for Germany. In Kyiv, in a Petlyurite prison, he became acquainted with the monarchist Pyotr Shabelsky-Bork, with whom he then constantly communicated while he was in exile.

Emigration 
At first, Taboritsky lived in Berlin, then in Mecklenburg, and from January to March 1922 in Munich. While in Berlin, he was co-editor of the antisemitic magazine Luch Sveta ("Ray of Light"), which was published from April 1919 onward. Luch Sveta had republished the notorious antisemitic forgery, the Protocols of the Elders of Zion. Before the assassination attempt on Paul Milyukov, he worked as a typewriter. For ideological reasons, he refused to take commissions from the Soviet Union.

In 1921, accidentally meeting former State Duma politician Alexander Guchkov on a street in Berlin, Taboritsky attacked him and beat him with an umbrella, for which he spent several days in a local prison.

Assassination attempt against Pavel Milyukov 
Together with Shabelsky-Bork, Taboritsky participated in the preparation of the assassination attempt against Pavel Milyukov. To accomplish that, they drove from Munich to Berlin. During the lecture of Milyukov, Taboritsky opened fire. When Vladimir Dmitrievich Nabokov rushed at Shabelsky, striking him in the arm in which he was holding a revolver, Taboritsky shot three times at point-blank range at Nabokov. Nabokov was immediately killed by a shot in the heart. After this, Taboritsky went to the wardrobe and, taking his clothes, went to the exit door, but a woman exclaimed: “Here is the killer!”, and Taboritsky was detained by the crowd. In addition to Nabokov who died on the spot, during the attempted indiscriminate shooting nine people were injured, including the chairman of the Berlin group of the Kadet party, L. E. Elyashev, and one of the editors of the “Rul” newspaper, Avgust Kaminka.

A medical examination of Shabelsky-Bork and Taboritsky showed that both had long been using drugs, a strong dose of which was taken on the day of the assassination.

The trial of the assassination attempt against Milyukov took place on July 3–7, 1922, in the Berlin Criminal Court in Moabit. The court sentenced Taboritsky to 14 years of hard labor for complicity in the attempt and intentionally inflicting serious wounds on Nabokov that caused his death, though in the spring of 1927 he was released under amnesty.

Activities under the Nazi regime 
Since May 1936 Taboritsky was the deputy of General Vasily Biskupsky for the Nazi-created Bureau for Russian Refugees in Germany (Vertrauensstelle für russische Flüchtlinge in Deutschland). Taboritsky's duties included maintaining a file cabinet of Russian emigration and political monitoring of its sentiments. After the outbreak of war with the USSR, he headed the recruitment of translators for the Wehrmacht among Russian emigrants. Taboritsky's activities were carried out in close contact with the Gestapo. Gleb Rahr describes Taboritsky as follows: “Dry, lean, pointed, wizened, slightly weazened type, not flowering, but fading”.

In April 1937, Taboritsky married Elisabeth von Knorre, granddaughter of the astronomer Karl Friedrich Knorre, who was a member of the Nazi party since 1931. After numerous petitions (including those on the name of Goebbels) and refusals, he received German citizenship (1938) and joined the NSDAP (1942, retroactively adopted from the date of application of 1940). He hid the Jewish origin of his mother and attributed German roots to her, and he ascribed the Russian nobility to the fictitious father, "Vladimir Vasilievich Taboritsky,". Pretending to be of noble origin, he used the German surname "von" (von Taboritzki). He claimed that the assassination attempt on the “leader of Jewish democracy” and the “hater of Germany” Milyukov, for which he was serving a criminal sentence, was a feat to his new homeland. He emphasized that he first made known the Protocols of Zion in Germany, and was proud of his persecution by Jews and “leftists”.

In 1939 he created the National Organization of Russian Youth (NORM). The organization was under the direct control of the SS. It was similar to the German Hitler Youth organization to which it was subordinate.

In the last days of the war, Taboritsky fled from Berlin, later living in Limburg an der Lahn. He continued to occasionally publish in the Brazilian monarchist journal Vladimirsky Vestnik. Taboritsky died on 16 October 1980.

See also 
 Aufbau Vereinigung
 Pyotr Shabelsky-Bork

References

1897 births
1980 deaths
Russian journalists
Russian anti-communists
Russian murderers
Russian nationalists
Nazi Party members
White Russian emigrants to Germany
Russian monarchists
German monarchists
20th-century Russian criminals
Russian people of Jewish descent
Russian fascists
Russian collaborators with Nazi Germany
White supremacists